The Kagwene Gorilla Sanctuary was proclaimed by the Cameroonian government on April 3, 2008. It protects 19.44 km2 of land, and is located between the Mbulu and Nijikwa forests in western Cameroon. Only about half of its land is a prime gorilla habitat, while the rest includes grassland or cultivation not suitable for the species. Due to its sanctuary status, it was expected to be provided with a conservator and eco-guards to enforce wildlife laws within its perimeters.

References

Protected areas established in 2008
Protected areas of Cameroon